Oats Street railway station is a railway station on the Transperth network in Perth, Western Australia. It is located on the Armadale and Thornlie line, 8.2 kilometres from Perth station serving the suburbs of Carlisle, East Victoria Park and Kewdale.

History
Oats Street station opened in November 1954. The station serves as the only station for Armadale Line passengers to transfer to the Thornlie Line and thus intermediate stations between Claisebrook and Cannington.
In 2020, the station's bus interchange was upgraded due to the bus facilities at the time being at capacity. The interchange was extended north, adding two new bus stands, bringing the total to four. Three new bus layover bays were added. The upgrade facilitated articulated buses using the interchange. Construction started in April 2020 and finished in August 2020.

Future
As part of a Metronet project for the removal of several level crossings on the Armadale line, Oats Street railway station  will be rebuilt as an elevated station, and situated on top of Oats Street, replacing the level crossing with a bridge. The planned design has two entrances on either side of Oats Street, and a new bus interchange underneath the railway with eight bus stands. The new station will initially be accessed via stairs and elevators, and its design will allow escalators and fare gates to be added in the future. Its platforms will be the length of a six-car train, as opposed to the current station which has platforms that are the length of four-car trains. The station will be built to the west of the current railway alignment, to allow train services to continue during construction.

Services
Oats Street station is served by Transperth Armadale/Thornlie line services.

The station saw 704,498 passengers in the 2013-14 financial year.

Platforms

Bus routes

References

External links

Armadale and Thornlie lines
Railway stations in Perth, Western Australia
Railway stations in Australia opened in 1954
Bus stations in Perth, Western Australia